Commercy is a commune in the Meuse department in Grand Est in north-eastern France. The 18th-century Lorraine historian Nicolas Luton Durival (1713–1795) was born in Commercy.

History
Commercy dates back to the 9th century, and at that time its lords were dependent on the bishop of Metz. In 1544 it was besieged by Charles V in person. For some time the lordship was in the hands of Jean François Paul de Gondi, cardinal de Retz, who lived in the town for a number of years, and there composed his memoirs. From him it was purchased by Charles IV, Duke of Lorraine. In 1744 it became the residence of Stanisław Leszczyński, king of Poland, who spent a great deal of care on the embellishment of the town, castle and neighbourhood.

Commercy is the home of the Madeleines referred to by Marcel Proust in À la recherche du temps perdu.

Population

People from Commercy 
 Nicolas Durival (1723–1795), historian
 Nicolas Alaidon (1738–1827),  curé de Toul, emigrated during the French Revolution, author of the Journal d'un prêtre pendant la Révolution (24 October 1738 – 1827).
 Henri Braconnot (1780–1855), chemist
 Henri Brocard (1845–1922), mathematician
 Georges Mangin (1873–1908), officer and explorer
 Benno Vigny (1889-1965), German-French scriptwriter and director
 Maurice Cloche (1907-1990), movie director
 Roger Lévy (1914-2006), Compagnon de la Libération
 Élisabeth de Miribel (1915-2005), Française libre
 Dominique Desseigne (1944), entrepreneur
 Pascal Vigneron (born 23 June 1963), organist, trumpeter, conductor, director of the Toul Bach Festival.
 Olivier Bluche (born 6 September 1958), French industrialist, philanthropist, landowner

In fiction
Commercy is the key location for action in the 1964 film The Train although this did not use the town for filming purposes.

Twin towns
It is twinned with the German town of Hockenheim.

See also
Communes of the Meuse department

References

External links

Office de Tourisme du Pays de Commercy (France)
Office de Tourisme du Pays de Commercy (European Union)

Communes of Meuse (department)
Subprefectures in France
Duchy of Lorraine